The Bamboozle Left was an annual two-day music festival held in California from 2006 to 2009, based on The Bamboozle festival on the Atlantic coast.

2006
The 2006 festival was held at the Cal Poly Pomona Athletic Field in Pomona, CA, on October 15 and October 16. Dashboard Confessional and Brand New headlined. In all, 68 Bands performed on 5 stages. The bands included:

October 15

All Time Low, Big Japan, Cute Is What We Aim For, Dashboard Confessional, Envy on the Coast, Halifax, Hellogoodbye, Hit the Lights, Jack's Mannequin, Jonas Brothers, Linc Thomas LLC, Red Jumpsuit Apparatus, Ronnie Day, Sugarcult, Van Stone, William Tell

October 16

Thirty Seconds to Mars, The Bled, Brand New, Chris Conley (Saves the Day), Cobra Starship, Escape the Fate, The Fall of Troy, Gym Class Heroes, Murs, Pistolita, The Spill Canvas, Supernova, Thrice, Van Stone, Yellowcard, I Am Ghost

2008
Took place on April 5 and April 6
My Chemical Romance, Paramore, and The All-American Rejects headlined the festival.
Held at the Verizon Wireless Amphitheatre in Irvine, California
Bands performed include:

April 5th

The All-American Rejects, A Rocket to the Moon, Alesana, Alkaline Trio, An Angle, The Audition, Austin Gibbs and the States, Automatic Loveletter, Bayside, Brighten, Broadway Calls, The Bouncing Souls, The Cab, The Chariot, Charlotte Sometimes, Dance Gavin Dance, Danger Radio, Daphne Loves Derby, Dear and the Headlights, Every Avenue, Eye Alaska, Face to Face, The Forecast, Four Year Strong, Hit the Lights, House of Fools, Jimmy Eat World, Josephine Collective, The Morning Light, My Evolution, New Found Glory, Our Last Night, Paper Rival, Paramore, Porcelain, Reel Big Fish, Rookie of the Year, Rx Bandits, Say No More, Sick Demencion, Sky Eats Airplane, Sound and Fury, The Starting Line, Steel Train, Story of the Year, Streetlight Manifesto, Supernova, The Tahiti Twins, Take the Crown, Takota, Valencia, Valora, Van Stone, Vogue in the Moment, We the Kings, and ZOX

April 6th

3OH!3, 7 Seconds, A Cursive Memory, A Day to Remember, The A.K.A.s, Anti-Flag, Armor for Sleep, Billy Talent, Blaqk Audio, The Bravery, Breathe Carolina, Chiodos, Chronic Future, The Color Fred, Creature Feature, Dead to Me, Dear Life, The Dillinger Escape Plan, Dr Manhattan, Drive By, Escape the Fate, Finch, Foxy Shazam, From First to Last, Goldfinger, H2O, Hawthorne Heights, Hot Water Music, Jeffree Star, Lydia, Making April, MC Lars, The Medic Droid, Metro Station, Millionaires, MxPx, My Chemical Romance, New Tomorrow, Palmerston, Pierce the Veil, Protest the Hero, Saves the Day, Schoolyard Heroes, Secondhand Serenade, Set Your Goals, Shook Ones, The Sleeping, theStart, Street Dogs, Suburban Legends, Suicide Silence, Vinnie Caruana, and Your Vegas

2009
Bamboozle 2009 is presented by WONKA
Scheduled for April 4, 2009 and April 5, 2009
Fall Out Boy are headlining Day 1; 50 Cent and Deftones are co-headlining Day 2
Held at the Verizon Wireless Amphitheatre in Irvine, California
The following bands and artists have been confirmed to perform on the respective dates:

April 4 lineup
Wonka Stage:
Mercy Mercedes, Forever the Sickest Kids, We the Kings, Senses Fail, Asher Roth, All Time Low, Metro Station, Fall Out Boy
Imagination Stage:
The Cab, The Aquabats, Silverstein, Bloodhound Gang, Hollywood Undead, Cobra Starship, The Get Up Kids
Saints & Sinners Stage:
Stereo Skyline, Fight Fair, The Jakes, The Friday Night Boys, Say It Twice, Racing Kites, The Morning Light, All the Day Holiday, Sonny, Breathe Carolina, brokeNCYDE
MLB Authentic Collection Stage:
The Limousines, Black Steel Rose, TBA, Care Bears on Fire, Valencia, Mychildren Mybride, Stick to Your Guns, Parkway Drive
State Farm Stage:
The Dangerous Summer, Sing it Loud, Artist vs. Poet, Hey Monday, NeverShoutNever!, Before Their Eyes, Blessthefall, Haste the Day
Kazoozle Stage:
Alevela, Can You Keep A Secret, Peachcake, Teen Hearts, Ultraviolet Sound, Every Avenue, Patent Pending, Anarbor, Twin Atlantic
Kazoozle Tent:
DJ Prime (5 sets), The Scene Aesthetic, DJ Prime (2 sets), Skrillex, LAZRtag, DJ Prime

April 5 lineup

Wonka Stage:
Acidic, Eye Alaska, Suicide Silence, The Vandals, The Used, Taking Back Sunday, 50 Cent
Imagination Stage:
Close But Not Quite, The Bled, Shwayze, Saosin, Thrice, Deftones
Saints & Sinners Stage:
Black Houses, The Dares, Fifteen Fleeting, Ten Second Epic, Dommin, Living With Lions, Funeral Party, Brave Citizens, I Am Ghost, Forgive Durden performing Razia's Shadow: A Musical
MLB Authentic Collection Stage:
Underneath the Gun, Closure in Moscow, Attack Attack!, Leathermouth, The Ghost Inside, Winds of Plague, Emmure, The Adolescents
State Farm Stage:
In Fear and Faith, Nations Afire, Trash Talk, Have Heart, A Skylit Drive, Born of Osiris, Ignite, The Bronx
Kazoozle Stage:
Drive A, DJ, One Block Radius, Chronic Future, Hyro Da Hero, B.o.B, LMFAO, Mac Lethal, P.O.S, Trouble Andrew
Kazoozle Tent:
Kevin Seconds, DJ Prime (5 sets), DJ Skeet Skeet (3 sets)

References

External links
The Bamboozle official website

Rock festivals in the United States
Music festivals in California